The Eloy Detention Center is a private prison located in Eloy, Pinal County, Arizona, owned and operated by CoreCivic, formerly the Corrections Corporation of America, under contract with the U.S. Immigration and Customs Enforcement (ICE).

History 
The facility opened in 1994 and approximately 1,550 male and female individuals being held for immigration violations at a mix of minimum and medium security levels. Each individual costs approximately $180 per day to house. Eloy is adjacent to three other prisons also run by CoreCivic: the Red Rock Correctional Center, the La Palma Correctional Facility, and the Saguaro Correctional Center.  

After the Trump administration's controversial zero-tolerance family separation policy in 2018, the facility housed roughly 300 mothers separated from their children.

Suicides 
ICE's internal Office of Detention Oversight investigated the death of Eloy detainee Manuel Cota-Domingo in 2012, and found serious issues with the quality of medical care provided by CCA. The facility had 15 detainee deaths between 2003 and late 2016, including five suicides.  Since 2003, Eloy alone represented 9% of the total inmate deaths in all 250 detention facilities in the United States.

As a result passing all inspections despite the facility's high suicide rate, the National Immigrant Justice Center found ICE and the Obama Administration of being complicit in hiding maltreatment at the center in a 2015 report. Also in 2015, U.S. Representative Raúl Grijalva toured the facility, calling it "the deadliest immigration detention center in the U.S." In late July 2015 he called for an independent investigation into the most recent suicide.

Notable detainees
Year of detention listed in parentheses:
 Binh Thai Luc (2006), Vietnamese plumber 
 Ike Ibeabuchi (2014), Nigerian boxer
 Nina Chaubal, Indian transgender rights activist

References

Prisons in Arizona
Buildings and structures in Pinal County, Arizona
CoreCivic
Eloy, Arizona
1994 establishments in Arizona
U.S. Immigration and Customs Enforcement
Immigration detention centers and prisons in the United States